Made In Africa Foundation is an organisation run from Uganda established to assist the development of the African continent, by providing first-stage funding for the feasibility studies and business development of large-scale infrastructure projects based in the region. The organisation was founded in 2011 by Savile Row tailor Ozwald Boateng OBE. The foundation has been dissolved in July 2015 according to U.K. companies house. It is now incorporated in Uganda.

The foundation is a spin-off of the for-profit Made in Africa founded by Ozwald Boateng, the Ugandan Prince Hassan Kimbugwe, and barrister Chris Cleverly in 2006. Chris Cleverly has the position of CEO of the Made in Africa Foundation, and oversees day-to-day execution. Chris Cleverly is cousin of UK Conservative party chairman James Cleverly.

Made in Africa Foundation engages with entities that include international governments, multilateral organisations such as the World Bank, financial institutions, and private investors, to advocate for the continent and the foundation's supported projects, and raise awareness of the economic changes taking place in Africa.

Mission

Supporting African Infrastructure and Enterprise 
The foundation's idea and mission is based Ozwald Boateng's statement: "It’s a well-known statistic that US$400 million of funding for feasibility studies and master plans across sub-Saharan Africa would develop over US$100 billion of infrastructure projects, which in turn would create a trillion dollars of value across Africa. The first step is often the hardest and we have created this Foundation with Atlantic Energy to make that step easier for Africans."

Engaging African Diaspora 
In a BBC Hardtalk interview, Ozwald Boateng discussed African diaspora returning to develop enterprises in the region, and urged more to do the same. Central to Made in Africa Foundation's objectives is to encourage and provide support for these individuals.

The foundation has taken efforts to show that it considers African Americans – who are a people of African origin – a part of its definition of the African diaspora, which it holds alongside those within Africa, as central to Africa's growth story. A foundation release following a press conference on the "unification of the African Diaspora" was disseminated at the 9th Annual African Union (AU) Summit in Accra, which was co-hosted by Made in Africa and former Ghanaian President and then AU Chairperson John Kofi Kufor. Within it Ozwald Boateng stated: "I felt that this [conference on unification] was important for me to be involved in for many different reasons, one of them is to allow African American’s to be part of this moment in history by inviting key African American’s to build a bridge between both continents - physically and spiritually… African Americans are a strong part of African’s future".

Made in Africa has previously linked with significant African American figures including Jamie Foxx, Chris Tucker, Mos Def, Isaiah Washington and Herbie Hancock to further advocate for this unity among African Americans.

Notable Projects 

In 2013 Made in Africa Foundation began working with the AfDB on their Programme for infrastructure development in Africa initiative (PIDA). The PIDA initiative aims to further the socioeconomic development of Africans, by greatly improving the continent's nascent power, transportation, water, and ICT infrastructure.

The programme consists of over 50 projects that it aims to implement between 2012 and 2040, for which Made in Africa Foundation will assist in raising foreign investment and greater public awareness.

This resulted in Made In Africa Foundation CEO, Chris Cleverly launching an initiative that raised the billion dollar Africa50 fund with Emmanuel Mbi, COO of AfDB on 14 June 2013. The Africa50 fund has launched numerous power projects across Africa.

Made In Africa Foundation is now focussed on Agriculture projects in Uganda.

Events 

Below are the events in which either Made in Africa or the Made in Africa Foundation has had an involvement.

Power of Unity - Accra 2007 

This event was the nickname Made in Africa gave to the 2007 AU State Banquet that it co-hosted with the then Ghanaian President and AU Chairperson John Kofi Kufor.

The event coincided with Ghana's 50th anniversary of independence, 200 years since the abolition of the transatlantic slave trade, and to mark the occasion rev. Jesse Jackson gave a speech written by Made in Africa CEO Chris Cleverly,  in front of the 53 African Heads of State and other dignitaries in attendance. The speech called for unity among African's and the diaspora, which was defined in the speech to include African Americans removed from the continent by slavery centuries earlier. A highlight of the speech can be seen in the Made in Africa Foundation film The Tipping Point.

Within the event Ozwald Boateng showcased his latest designs in a catwalk show, which featured Ghanaian footballer Michael Essien as one of the models.

Joining Up Africa - London 2010 

This conference was hosted by the UK Department for International Development, and jointly organised by the AU commission, AfDB, the World Bank and other international agencies.

At the event Ozwald Boateng gave a speech to urge international governments and agencies to provide more support for African entrepreneurs and investments.

Our Future Made in Africa - Marrakech 2013 
Made in Africa Foundation in collaboration with the African Banker Awards and supported by Atlantic Energy, put together the gala event Our Future Made in Africa at the Taj Palace Hotel in Marrakech, Morocco. The event featured a fashion show, the African banker awards, and performances from John Legend, Akon, Youssou N'dour, and Yasiin Bey formerly known as Mos Def.

A film raising awareness of the possibilities in Africa featuring Ozwald Boateng and made by the foundation called Our Future Made in Africa, premiered at the event to a standing ovation. Alongside raising Africa's image, one of the principle purposes of the event was to fundraise and get support for the AfDB's programme for infrastructure development projects. In attendance were several of Africa's high-net-worth individuals, including Mo Ibrahim.

Part of the event's success was shown in the co-operation agreement the Made in Africa Foundation was able to sign with Obasanjo Foundation, founded by former Nigerian President Olusegun Obasanjo. The signed agreement stated that the Obasanjo Foundation will - within its power - provide assistance, including financial assistance, to further the Made in Africa Foundation cause.

AfDB President Donald Kaberuka also received a special award from the foundation, for his efforts to transform Africa whilst at the institution.

In the Press

Television

Hardtalk - January 2013 

Ozwald Boateng was interviewed by Zeinab Badawi on the BBC programme, and gave an explanation for what he described as African diaspora refocusing their investments and entrepreneurial activities on the continent after the financial crisis of 2008.

A question was posed relating to the fears some hold about the sweatshop-style exploitation that could occur if manufacturing industries such as textiles are too rapidly developed. He responded stating that for the socioeconomic growth of the locals making a start should be the priority, after which issues can be addressed as they arise.

BBC World Service – November 2012 

Ozwald Boateng was interviewed by Savhana Nightingale for BBC World Service on the AfDB's infrastructure bonds, which he thinks should be offered to Africa's diaspora, and on the fashion stores he plans on opening across Africa.

Magazines 

Ozwald Boateng and the Made in Africa Foundation were chosen as guest editors for the May 2013 issue of the pan-African magazine the New African. This issue coincided with the African Union's 50th Anniversary and was titled Our Future Made in Africa - What Africans can do in the next 50 years, containing articles written by key continental players assessing Africa's past pitfalls and future possibilities.

Contributors included Liberian and Gabonese Presidents Ellen Johnson Sirleaf and Omar Bongo Ondimba, Mo Ibrahim, former UK Prime Minister Tony Blair, Director-General of UNIDO Kandeh Yumkella, British architect David Adjaye, among many others.

See also 

Ozwald Boateng
African Development Bank
African Union
New African Magazine

References

External links 
 Made in Africa Foundation Website
 Ozwald Boateng's Website
 Atlantic Energy's Website

Development charities based in the United Kingdom
2011 establishments in the United Kingdom